Nouvelle is a French word, the feminine form of "new". It may refer to:
Places
 Nouvelle, Quebec, a municipality in Quebec, Canada
 Nouvelle-Église, a commune in the Pas-de-Calais department, France
 Port-la-Nouvelle, a commune in the Aude department, France
Other
 Nouvelle, the French name for a novella
 Nouvelle AI, an approach to the artificial intelligence in the 1980s 
 Nouvelle Chanson, a musical genre which emerged in France in the 1990s
 Battle of the Brave (Nouvelle-France), a 2004 historical romance film directed by Jean Beaudin 
 Nouvelle histoire, a French historiographic current from the 1970s
 Nouvelle Planète, a Swiss non-profit organization
 Nouvelle Star, a French television series based on the Pop Idol programme 
 Nouvelle Tendance, an art movement founded in Yugoslavia in 1961 
 Nouvelle Vague, informal denomination of a movement of French filmmakers of the late 1950s and 1960s
 La Nouvelle Tribune, a weekly francophone Moroccan newspaper